Waipango is a farming locality in Southland, New Zealand, on the flat between the lower reaches of the Pourakino and Aparima Rivers. It is 8 km north-west of Riverton, 14 km south-west of Thornbury, and 14 km north-east of Colac Bay. The name, from the Māori language, literally translates as Wai meaning water, and pango meaning black.

References

Populated places in Southland, New Zealand